Sainville is a commune in the Eure-et-Loir department in northern France.

Population

Notable residents
 Eugène Farcot (1830-1896), clockmaker and aeronautical engineer born in this town. A museum and the central square in Sainville bear his name.

See also
Communes of the Eure-et-Loir department

References

Communes of Eure-et-Loir